My Son Is a Criminal is a 1939 American crime film directed by Charles C. Coleman (as C.C. Coleman Jr.) and starring Alan Baxter, Julie Bishop, Gordon Oliver and Willard Robertson.

Plot
Former police chief Tim Halloran Sr. (Willard Robertson) fully expects his Tim Jr. (Alan Baxter) to follow in his footsteps, flat though they may be. Instead, the younger Halloran opts for the easy road of crime

Cast
 Alan Baxter as Tim Halloran Jr.
 Julie Bishop as Myrna Kingsley (as Jacqueline Wells)
 Gordon Oliver as Allen Coltrin 
 Willard Robertson as Tom Halloran Sr. 
 Joe King as Jerry Kingsley (as Joseph King)
 Eddie Laughton as Walt Fraser
 John Tyrrell as Jersey

See also
 List of American films of 1939

References

External links
My Son Is a Criminal at the Internet Movie Database

1939 films
American action films
1930s action films
Films directed by Charles C. Coleman
American black-and-white films
Columbia Pictures films
1930s American films